Tommi Santala (born June 27, 1979 in Helsinki, Finland) is a Finnish professional ice hockey player who is currently playing for HIFK of the Liiga.

Playing career
Santala started his pro career in Jokerit in the Finnish SM-liiga in the 1998–99 season. After a total of four seasons with HPK, Santala moved to the Thrashers' organisation for the 2003–04 NHL season. Santala divided his time between 50 games in the AHL Chicago Wolves and 33 NHL games. He spent the 2004–05 NHL lockout with the Wolves registering 40 assists and 48 points in 67 games. During the post-season he helped Chicago win the Robert W. Clarke Trophy, for AHL Western Conference Champions, by adding 11 points in 18 games. However, the Wolves were swept in the Calder Cup finals by the Philadelphia Phantoms.

After the lockout, Santala was assigned to Jokerit by the Thrashers. He played one year with Jokerit before Atlanta traded him to the Vancouver Canucks. Santala played 30 games for the Canucks during the 2006–07 season, but he suffered a knee injury on December 8, 2006 in a game vs. the Carolina Hurricanes that forced him to miss the majority of the season. On September 5, 2007 he signed as a free agent with Jokerit.

After one season back with Jokerit, Santala opted to leave and sign with Swiss club, the Kloten Flyers from the 2008–09 season. He parted company with the team in December 2016 to join the KHL. On December 23, 2016, he inked a deal with Metallurg Magnitogorsk.

Unhappy with his KHL experience, Santala returned to EHC Kloten on a one-year deal for the 2017-18 season.

International play
Santala played for Team Finland in the 1999 World Junior Championship registering two points through six games. He represented Finland at the World Championships in, 2003, 2006, 2009, and 2010. However, he only played one game for the 2006 Finnish team that won the Bronze medal. Santala had a much larger role for Finland during the 2002 Karlja Cup. Finland won the Gold and Santala was named a Second Team All-Star.

Career statistics

Regular season and playoffs

International

Transactions 
 June 26, 1999 — Drafted by the Atlanta Thrashers in the 9th round, 245th overall.
 June 14, 2006 — Traded to the Vancouver Canucks along with a 5th round pick in the 2007 NHL Entry Draft for a conditional draft pick in the 2007 NHL Entry Draft.

References

External links 

1979 births
Atlanta Thrashers draft picks
Atlanta Thrashers players
Chicago Wolves players
Finnish ice hockey centres
HPK players
Jokerit players
EHC Kloten players
Living people
Manitoba Moose players
Ice hockey people from Helsinki
Vancouver Canucks players